The 1998–99 Chicago Blackhawks season was the 73rd season of operation of the Chicago Blackhawks in the National Hockey League. They missed the playoffs in back to back seasons for the first time since the 1957–58 season.

Offseason

Regular season
The Blackhawks allowed the most power-play goals of all 27 teams, with 80. Captain Chris Chelios was traded late in the season, to the Detroit Red Wings. The team finishes the season without a captain.

Final standings

Schedule and results

Player statistics

Awards and records

Transactions

Draft picks
Chicago's draft picks at the 1998 NHL Entry Draft held at the Marine Midland Arena in Buffalo, New York.

See also
1998–99 NHL season

References
Bibliography
 
 

C
C
Chicago Blackhawks seasons
Chic
Chic